The 1911 Virginia Orange and Blue football team represented the University of Virginia as an independent during the 1911 college football season. Led by Kemper Yancey in his first and only season as head coach, the Orange and Blue compiled a record of 8–2.

Schedule

References

Virginia
Virginia Cavaliers football seasons
Virginia Orange and Blue football